Ballybacon–Grange GAA is a Gaelic Athletic Association club located in the areas of Goatenbridge and Ardfinnan in County Tipperary, Ireland. The club plays hurling in the Intermediate competitions at county level and in the South division of Tipperary GAA. The club has a fraternal co-existence with Ardfinnan Gaelic Football Club which is also affiliated to the GAA.  As a consequence, some club hurlers also play football with Ardfinnan GAA.

Hurling
In 2018, the club won its 13th South Tipperary Intermediate Hurling Championship after a four-point win against  Carrick Davins in the final.

On 4 November 2017, they won the Tipperary Junior 'A' Hurling Championship after a 0–19 to 1–11 win against Toomevara, it was their first ever adult county title.
On 12 November 2017, Ballybacon–Grange reached the 2017 Munster Club Junior Hurling Championship final after a 1–11 to 0–9 win against St Catherine's from Cork in the semi-final in Ardfinnan. They had earlier defeated Kenmare in the quarter final by 5–24 to 1–4. In the final on 3 December 2017, they faced Ardmore in Mallow.
They lost the final on a 3–11 to 2–8 scoreline in a match where four players were sent off, three from Ardmore.

Honours
 South Tipperary Senior Hurling Championship (1)
 1968
 South Tipperary Intermediate Hurling Championship (14)
 1966, 1976, 1980, 1998, 1999, 2000, 2001, 2003, 2004, 2007, 2012, 2013 2018, 2019
 Tipperary Junior A Hurling Championship (1)
 2017
 South Tipperary Junior 'A' Hurling Championship (3)
 1962, 2016, 2017
 South Tipperary Junior 'B' Hurling Championship (3)
 1992 2001 2019
 South Tipperary Under-21 'A' Hurling Championship (5)
 1961, 1963, 1968, 1984 1995
 South Tipperary Under-21 'B' Hurling Championship (3)
 1992, 2002, 2010
 South Tipperary Minor 'A' Hurling Championship (5)
 1945, 1961, 1991, 1992, 2009
 South Tipperary Minor 'B' Hurling Championship (6)
 1984 1989, 1994, 2001, 2012, 2013

Notable players
 Michael "Babs" Keating, famous Tipperary hurler of the 1960s and  70's.......holder of 2 All Ireland senior hurling medals & 2 All Ireland senior hurling titles as manager in 1989 & 1991 '
 Brendan Cummins
 Michael Phelan

Camogie
Ballybacon–Grange formed a juvenile camogie club in 2013.

References

External links
 Ballybacon–Grange GAA on Twitter
 Club blog
 Tipperary GAA site

Hurling clubs in County Tipperary
Gaelic games clubs in County Tipperary